Miss America 1957, the 30th Miss America pageant, was held at the Boardwalk Hall in Atlantic City, New Jersey on September 8, 1956, on ABC.

Marian McKnight became the first Miss South Carolina to take the crown.

Results

Awards

Preliminary awards

Other awards

Contestants

External links
 Miss America official website

1957
1956 in the United States
1957 beauty pageants
1956 in New Jersey
September 1956 events in the United States
Events in Atlantic City, New Jersey